The Magic Millions 2YO Classic is a Gold Coast Turf Club Restricted Listed Thoroughbred horse race. The race is conducted under set weights and is restricted to two year old horses that were bought at a Magic Millions Sale auction. Eligible auctions are held at Gold Coast, Tasmania, Perth and Adelaide. Prizemoney is $2,000,000.

History
The race was first held in 1987 and has always been held at set weights. The race forms part of the Magic Millions carnival which incorporates the Gold Coast Yearling Sale and the Magic Millions Raceday is fully restricted to horses that have been sold or passed-in at one of the Magic Millions sales. Magic Millions along with Racing Queensland introduced a revamped Queensland Summer Racing Carnival in 2017, increasing the prizemoney on offer to make it Australia's first $10 million raceday.
In 1988 the race was split to hold separate sex divisions for fillies and for colts & geldings and in 1991 was reverted to a mixed sex race. Held in January every year, the race is the first of three million dollar races for 2YO's, the other two being the Blue Diamond at Caulfield and the Golden Slipper at Rosehill.

Grade
1987 onwards- Restricted Listed

Name
 1987 onwards- Magic Millions 2YO Classic

Distance
 The race has always been held at 1200m

Double winners
Thoroughbreds that have won the Magic Millions Classic – the Golden Slipper double

 Capitalist 2016
 Phelan Ready 2009
 Dance Hero 2004

Winners

 2023 - Skirt the Law
 2022 - Coolangatta
 2021 - Shaquero
 2020 - Away Game
 2019 - Exhilarates
 2018 - Sunlight
 2017 - Houtzen
 2016 - Capitalist
 2015 - Le Chef
 2014 - Unencumbered
 2013 - Real Surreal
 2012 - Driefontein
 2011 - Karuta Queen
 2010 - Military Rose
 2009 - Phelan Ready
 2008 - Augusta Proud
 2007 - Mimi Lebrock
 2006 - Mirror Mirror
 2005 - Bradbury's Luck
 2004 - Dance Hero
 2003 - Regimental Gal
 2002 - Lovely Jubly
 2001 - Excellerator
 2000 - Assertive Lad
 1999 - Testa Rossa
 1998 - Catnipped
 1997 - General Nediym
 1996 - Winger Charger
 1995 - Zephyrz
 1994 - Brave Warrior
 1993 - Our Fiction
 1992 - Clan O'Sullivan
 1991 - Bold Promise
 1990 - St Jude C&G/Dancers Joy F
 1988 - Sunblazer C&G/Malibu Magic F
 1988 - Molokai Prince C&G/Sea Cabin F
 1987 - Snippets

See also
 List of Australian Group races
 Group races

References

Horse races in Australia
Flat horse races for two-year-olds